Celeirós may refer to:

 Celeirós (Braga), a civil parish in the municipality of Braga, Portugal
 Celeirós (Sabrosa), a civil parish in the municipality of Sabrosa, Portugal

Parish name disambiguation pages